Lyria deliciosa is a species of sea snail, a marine gastropod mollusk in the family Volutidae, the volutes.

Description
The length of the shell attains 30 mm.

Distribution
This marine species occurs off New Caledonia.

References

 Montrouzier, X., 1859. Descriptions d'espèces nouvelles de l'Archipel Calédonien. Journal de Conchyliologie 7"1858": 373-375
 Montrouzier, X., 1860. Descriptions d'espèces nouvelles de l'Archipel Calédonien. Journal de Conchyliologie 8: 111-122

Volutidae
Gastropods described in 1859